State Highway 97 (SH-97) is a state highway in Kootenai County, Idaho. The entire highway is designated as the Lake Coeur d'Alene Scenic Byway.

Route description

State Highway 97 begins at a Y intersection with State Highway 3, part of the White Pine Scenic Byway, in an unincorporated area within the Coeur d'Alene Reservation north of Parkline. The highway travels northwest through the reservation, passing Kootenai Junior/Senior High School, towards Harrison on the shores of Lake Coeur d'Alene. SH-97 turns northeastward within Harrison and leaves the reservation by crossing over the Coeur d'Alene River. The highway continues north along the shore of Lake Coeur d'Alene at the foot of hills that form part of the Coeur d'Alene National Forest. SH-97 ends at a diamond interchange with Interstate 90 at the east end of Wolf Lodge Bay.

History

The route along the east side of Lake Coeur d'Alene was formerly part of U.S. Route 95 Alternate, which was designated until 1977.

Major intersections

References

097
Transportation in Kootenai County, Idaho